"Sky Full of Song" is a song by English indie rock band Florence and the Machine from their fourth studio album, High as Hope (2018). It was written and produced by Florence Welch, Emile Haynie and Thomas Bartlett. The song was released on 12 April 2018 as a 7-inch single for Record Store Day.

Background
Sky Full of Song was inspired by Welch performing on stage. She opened up that she feels an otherworldly sense of being. However, at the same time she feels a sense of loneliness once she starts performing on stage. At times she doesn't know how to enjoy herself and so lets the song take over her being. According to the Rolling Stone magazine Welch made a statement, that “Sky Full of Song” came to her “fully formed.” She said, “Sometimes when you are performing you get so high, it’s hard to know how to come down. [...] There is this feeling of being cracked open, rushing endlessly outwards and upwards, and wanting somebody to hold you still, bring you back to yourself. It’s an incredible, celestial, but somehow lonely feeling.”

Credits and personnel
Credits adapted from the liner notes of High as Hope.

Recording and management
Recorded at Beacon House, Sunset Sound, Vox Recording Studios (Los Angeles)
Mixed at Electric Lady Studios (New York)
Mastered at Metropolis Mastering (London)
Published by Universal Music Publishing Ltd, Universal Music Corp/Heavycrate Music (ASCAP), Domino Songs Ltd

Personnel

Florence Welch – vocals, composition, production, percussion
Emile Haynie – composition, production, synths, drums, recording
Thomas Bartlett – composition, additional production, bass, keyboards
Greg Leisz – pedal steel guitar
Rob Ackroyd – guitars
Tom Monger – harp
Jasper Randall – vocal contractor
Angela Parrish – backing vocals
Leslie Stevens – backing vocals
Brett Shaw – recording
Morgan Stratton – additional recording
Michael Harris – additional recording
Zachary Zajdel – engineering assistance
Christopher Cerullo – engineering assistance
Tom Elmhirst – mixing
John Davis – mastering

Charts

References

2018 singles
2018 songs
Florence and the Machine songs
Virgin EMI Records singles
Song recordings produced by Emile Haynie
Song recordings produced by Florence Welch
Songs written by Florence Welch
Songs written by Emile Haynie
Songs written by Doveman
Songs about loneliness